The T-80 is a main battle tank designed in the Soviet Union.

T80 or T-80 may also refer to:
 Bishop's Landing Airport, an airport in Celina, Collin County, Texas, United States with an FAA location identifier of T80
 Canon T80, a 1985 35mm SLR camera
 Mercedes-Benz T80, a vehicle designed to break the world land speed record 
 Pir Panjal Railway Tunnel, also known as T-80.
 Route T80, a T-Way bus service operated by Transit Systems NSW
 T-80 light tank, a variant of the World War II Soviet T-70 tank
 an open source version of Zilog Z80 computer processor